"No Picnic Tomorrow" is an Australian television drama one-off which aired in 1960 on ATN-7 in Sydney and GTV-9 in Melbourne (as this was prior to the creation of the Seven Network and Nine Network). Part of the Shell Presents series of one-off television dramas and comedies, it was produced in Melbourne, but first shown in Sydney on 9 January 1960.

Plot
An Australian woman, Gwennie, and a man of Greek descent, Tony, intend to marry. However Tony's mother decides to arrange a marriage between him and a Greek woman who is coming to Australia.

Cast
Margaret Browne as Gwennie
Robin Ramsay as Tony
Peter Aanensen as Mr Sweeney
Marjorie Archibald as Mrs Sweeney
Nina Black as Mrs Demetrius
Carol Armstrong as Greek girl
Bruce Archer

Production
The drama was written by Barbara Vernon, best known at the time for writing the play The Multi-Coloured Umbrella (adapted for television in 1958), and who had previously written the ABC TV comedy one-off The Passionate Pianist in 1957. It was filmed at GTV-9 studios and on location in Melbourne.

Margaret Brown filmed the role during a two week break from her regular job.

Duration was 60 minutes including commercials (running time excluding commercials is not known. Homicide episodes from the mid-1960s typically run 45–47 minutes, while some early locally produced hour-long programming on commercial television could run as long as 51 minutes).

Reception
The TV critic from the Sydney Morning Herald thought "the promising basic situation" of the play "suffered, as written, from lack of richness in characterisation and dialogue and, as performed, from the flat low-voltage personalities of the mainly Melbourne players... the play's important dramatic issue... is stated... but not dramatised with any intensity."

Another critic thought it was "not up to the standard" of The Big Day but was "a fair effort" where the "cast, although inclined to be a bit too doggedly Australian at times, acted with sincerity and conviction."

See also
 A Little South of Heaven - 1961 ABC television play with a similar theme
 List of television plays broadcast on ATN-7

References

External links
 
 

1960s television plays
1960 Australian television episodes
1960s Australian television plays
Shell Presents